Luke Price (born 26 September 1995) is a Welsh rugby union player who plays for Ospreys as a fly-half. He is a Wales under-20 international.

Price made his debut for the Ospreys in 2012 having previously played for the Ospreys academy Aberavon RFC, Neath RFC, Swansea RFC and Bridgend Ravens.

External links 
Ospreys Player Profile

1995 births
Living people
Ospreys (rugby union) players
Rugby union players from Neath
Welsh rugby union players
Rugby union fly-halves